Penghu 1 is a fossil jaw (mandible) belonging to an extinct hominin species of the genus Homo from Taiwan which lived in the middle-late Pleistocene. The precise classification of the mandible is disputed, some arguing that it represents a new species, Homo tsaichangensis, whereas others believe it to be the fossil of a H. erectus, an archaic H. sapiens or possibly a Denisovan.

History and discovery 
The fossil was recovered sometime before 2008 by fishermen working in the Pescadores Channel between the Penghu Islands and mainland Taiwan. It was found 60–120 meters below the water's surface and about 25 kilometers off the western coast of Taiwan in an area which was once part of the mainland. Sea levels have risen since the last ice age and in consequence have submerged the area where the fossil was recovered. It was described in 2015 by an international team of Japanese, Taiwanese, and Australian scientists.

Penghu 1 is currently housed at the National Museum of Natural Science in Taichung.

The fossil is stratigraphically dated to younger than 450 kya, based on prehistoric sea-level lowering to either between 190 to 130 kya, or to between 70 and 10 kya.

Fossil morphology 
The fossil consists of a nearly complete right lower jaw with four teeth, including worn molars and premolars. The mandible has a high index of robustness, a robust lateral torus, large molars, and with the help of 3D reconstruction it was revealed to have a large bicondylar breadth. These features help confirm that the fossil was from the middle-late Pleistocene era. The alveoli of its four incisors and right canine have been preserved as well showing their great length. The specimen was assigned to the genus Homo based on it jaw and tooth morphology. The mandible shows a receding anterior surface and lacks a pronounced chin which has helped distinguish it from the species Homo sapiens. However, the fossil exhibited derived traits similar to early Homo habilis including the shortness and width of its jaw. These and other characteristics such as the agenesis of the M3 molar have been sufficient enough evidence to classify the specimen of the genus Homo.

Classification 
Although the genus of the Penghu 1 has been widely accepted, there is much discussion on the potential species of the specimen. The Penghu 1 mandible has been described as most similar to Hexian fossils of Homo erectus. Both Penghu 1 and the Hexian mandible share similar crown size, mandibular prominence, and general robustness. As a result of these similarities and their late presence in Eastern Asia, the authors of "The first Archaic Homo of Taiwan" proposed several models for their existence. The features the mandibles' shared could be explained by either the retention of primitive characteristics of early Asian Homo erectus, a migration of Homo with robust jaws from Africa, inclusion in the species Homo heidelbergensis, or they could have been an adapted form of Homo erectus. However, the species identity or taxonomic relationships lack consensus due to limited material. Co-author Yousuke Kaifu cautioned that additional skeletal parts are needed before species evaluation, but paleontologist Mark McMenamin argued that unique dental characteristics of the jaw were sufficient to establish a separate species, which he dubbed Homo tsaichangensis. McMenamin compares Penghu 1 to Gigantopithecus jaw fragments found in Semedo Village in Central Java, insisting on their relationship being a case of convergent evolution. He refers to these fragments as Gigantopithecus cf. G. blacki, (in this case cf. means that the fragments probably belongs to the species Gigantopithecus blacki, but it is possible that they belong to some other, yet undescribed, Gigantopithecus species) and he explains that this genus was once deemed similar to Homo and Australopithecus until later being recognized as a giant pongid.

Gigantopithecus cf. G. blacki and Homo tsaichangensis have similar tooth morphology, suggesting related dietary choices and similar geographical range extensions. The discoveries of Gigantopithecus cf. G. blacki and Homo tsaichangensis also revealed that they both inhabited the Tegal-Penghu Biogeographic Province around 250 kya. McMenamin then forms the conclusion that because they lived in the same province and had access to the same food sources, they both had to adapt to a diet rich in bamboo and other surrounding vegetation to survive. McMenamin agrees with a potential explanation provided by Chang, that the Penghu 1 specimen represents a hominin which evolved from a gracile-jawed Homo erectus to better suit its environment, thus affording it to be classified as a separate species called Homo tsaichangensis. Chinese anthropologists Xinzhi Wu and Haowen Tong are not so eager in the adoption of a new species, tentatively assigning the mandible to archaic Homo sapiens, leaving open the possibility of elevating it to a distinct species should more fossils be discovered. In a 2015 paper, Lelo Suvad accepted the validity of the new species H. tsaichangensis.

In 2019 Chen Fahu along with a group of co-authors presented a piece suspecting the Penghu 1 mandible to be a member of the hominid group Denisovans. This conclusion has been supported through its comparison with the Denisovan Xiahe mandible. The Xiahe mandible was discovered on the Tibetan Plateau and is dated to be about 160,000 years old. The Xiahe specimen has similar dental morphology compared to Penghu 1. They share 4 distinct characteristics: their M2's are close in mesiodistal width, they both show the agenesis of the M3 molar, they have a similar unique M2 root structure which relates to modern Asian populations, and the P3 displays Tomes' root, which is rarely found in other fossil hominins.

See also 
 Dispersal of Homo erectus
 Prehistory of Taiwan

References

External links 

 Human Timeline (Interactive) – Smithsonian, National Museum of Natural History (August 2016).

Penghu Islands
Early species of Homo
Pleistocene primates
Homo fossils
History of Taiwan